The following lists events that happened during 1999 in Rwanda.

Incumbents 
 President: Pasteur Bizimungu 
 Prime Minister: Pierre-Célestin Rwigema

Events

April
 April 21 - Rwanda rejects the peace agreement in Libya to end the Second Congo War.

May
 May 28 - Rwanda declares a ceasefire in the Democratic Republic of the Congo.

References

 
1990s in Rwanda
Years of the 20th century in Rwanda
Rwanda
Rwanda